The 1947–48 Washington Huskies men's basketball team represented the University of Washington for the  NCAA college basketball season. Led by first-year head coach Art McLarney, the Huskies were members of the Pacific Coast Conference and played their home games on campus at Hec Edmundson Pavilion in Seattle, Washington.

Held at neutral McArthur Court in Eugene, Oregon, the Huskies defeated the injury-hampered Beavers by seventeen points.

Washington advanced to the three-game conference championship series at Berkeley against host California, the Southern Division champion. The Golden Bears won the opener, but the Huskies rallied and took the next two for the conference title. It was the first time in fourteen years that a Northern team won the playoff series on a Southern home court.

The eight-team NCAA tournament had two regionals with four teams each.  Washington fell to Baylor by two points in the opener of the West regional in  In the regional third place game, the Huskies defeated Wyoming by 

Longtime head coach Hec Edmundson stepped down before this season, but continued as track coach; the twenty-year-old UW Pavilion was renamed for him in

Postseason results

|-
!colspan=6 style=| Pacific Coast Conference Northern Division Playoff

|-
!colspan=6 style=| Pacific Coast Conference Playoff Series

|-
!colspan=6 style=| NCAA Tournament

References

External links
Sports Reference – Washington Huskies: 1947–48 basketball season

Washington Huskies men's basketball seasons
Washington Huskies
Washington
Washington